Rice Krispies Treats (also called 'Rice Krispie Treats', 'RKTs', 'bars', 'rice buns', or 'buns' and alternatively 'cakes', 'Marshmallow Treats', 'Marshmallow Squares', or 'Rice Krispies Squares' in Canada, and 'LCMs' in Australia) are a confection commonly made through binding Kellogg's Rice Krispies or another crisp rice cereal together with butter or margarine and marshmallow. Though they are traditionally home-made, Kellogg's began to market the treats themselves in 1995.

History 
Rice Krispies Treats were invented in 1939 by Kellogg Company employees Malitta Jensen and Mildred Day "in the Kellogg kitchens in Battle Creek, Michigan as a promotional vehicle for the cereal." Kellogg's began commercially to produce plain and chocolate-based treats under the trademark brand-names of "Rice Krispies Treats" (in the U.S. and Mexico), "Squares" (in Canada, Ireland and the U.K.) and "LCMs" (in Australia and New Zealand) in 1995; however, other manufacturers had offered similar products under variant names (such as "Crisped Rice Treats" or "Marshmallow Treats") prior to this. Kellogg's has also offered a breakfast cereal based on the confection since the 1990s.

See also
 Chocolate crackles
 Sachima
 Rengginang
 White Christmas (food)

References

External links

 
 More recipes and product information from Rice Krispies Canada

Breakfast cereals
Cereal bars
Brand name confectionery
Marshmallows
Rice dishes
American confectionery
Kellogg's brands